The Tim River is a river in the Saint Lawrence River drainage basin in the Unorganized South Part of Nipissing District in northeastern Ontario, Canada. The river is entirely within Algonquin Provincial Park, and is a left tributary of the Petawawa River.

Course
The river begins at Tim Lake in geographic Butt Township and flows east over Tim Lake Dam, enters geographic Devine Township, passes through Rosebary Lake and reaches Longbow Lake. It leaves the lake over Longbow Lake Dam, continues east into geographic Bishop Township, passes through Shippagew Lake, and empties into Longer Lake on the Petawawa River. The Petawawa flows via the Ottawa River to the Saint Lawrence River.

Tributaries
Little Trout Creek (right)
David Creek (right)
Pezheki Creek (right)
Longbow Lake
Vanity Creek (left)

See also
List of rivers of Ontario

References

Sources

Rivers of Nipissing District
Tributaries of the Ottawa River